Association football tournaments were held at the East Asian Games from its first edition in 1999 until the last Games in 2013. Participating players had to be under 23 years of age. Men's football was featured at every event while women's football was included only in 2013.

Medal table

Events

Men's event

Participating nations

Results

Women's event

Participating nations

Results

References

 
International association football competitions in Asia
East Asian Games